Robert Christian Hansen (February 15, 1939 – August 21, 2014), known in the media as the Butcher Baker, was an American serial killer. Between 1971 and 1983, Hansen abducted, raped, and murdered at least seventeen women in and around Anchorage, Alaska; he hunted many of them down in the wilderness with a Ruger Mini-14 and a knife. He was arrested and convicted in 1983, and was sentenced to 461 years without the possibility of parole. He died in 2014 of natural causes due to lingering health conditions at age 75.

Early life
Robert Christian Boes Hansen was born in Estherville, Iowa, at Coleman Hospital on February 15, 1939, the elder of two children to an American mother and a Danish father. The family moved to Richmond, California in 1942, but returned to Iowa in 1949, settling in Pocahontas. His mother was Edna Margret Petersen. His father Christian Hansen (1907–1983) owned a bakery in the town, and Robert was employed at the bakery. In his youth, he was painfully shy, had a stutter and severe acne that left him permanently scarred. Not receiving the attention he wanted from the attractive girls in school, Hansen grew up hating them and nursing fantasies of cruel revenge.

Throughout childhood and adolescence, Hansen was described as being quiet and a loner, and he had a difficult relationship with his domineering father. He started to practice both hunting and archery, and often found refuge in these pastimes. In 1957, Hansen enlisted in the United States Army Reserve and served for one year before being discharged. He later worked as an assistant drill instructor at a police academy in Pocahontas, Iowa. There, he began a relationship with a younger woman. He married her in the summer of 1960.

First crimes
On December 7, 1960, Hansen was arrested for burning down a Pocahontas County Board of Education school bus garage, revenge for his unpopularity in high school. He served twenty months of a three-year prison sentence in Anamosa State Penitentiary. During his incarceration, he was diagnosed with manic depression with periodic schizophrenic episodes. The psychiatrist who made the diagnosis noted that Hansen had an “infantile personality” and was obsessed with getting back at people he felt had wronged him. Hansen's wife filed for divorce while he was incarcerated.

Over the next few years, Hansen was jailed several times for petty theft. In 1967, he moved to Anchorage, Alaska, with his second wife, whom he had married in 1963 and with whom he had two children. In Anchorage, he was well liked by his neighbors and set several local hunting records.

In December 1971, Hansen was arrested twice: first for abducting and attempting to rape an unidentified housewife, and then for raping an unidentified sex worker. He pleaded no contest to assault with a deadly weapon in the offense involving the housewife; the rape charge involving the sex worker was dropped as part of a plea bargain. Hansen was sentenced to five years in prison; after serving six months of his sentence, he was placed on a work release program and released to a halfway house. In 1976, Hansen pleaded guilty to larceny after he was caught stealing a chainsaw from an Anchorage Fred Meyer store. He was sentenced to five years in prison and required to receive psychiatric treatment for his bipolar disorder. The Alaska Supreme Court reduced his sentence, and he was released with time served.

Murders 
Hansen is believed to have begun killing around 1972. His modus operandi was to pick up a prostitute in his car and force her at gunpoint to his home, where he would rape her; he would then fly her out to a secluded area and "hunt" her as if she were wild game before shooting or stabbing her.

It is believed by some that Hansen's first murder victim was 18-year-old Celia "Beth" van Zanten. Van Zanten was kidnapped on December 22, 1971, and froze to death in the wilderness after escaping from her abductor; her body was discovered on December 25. Van Zanten's abduction occurred three days after Hansen assaulted a prostitute and four days before the prostitute turned him in. While there are some similarities to Hansen's modus operandi and Van Zanten's abduction, there is no conclusive evidence that he was her attacker, and he himself has denied involvement in her death.

On June 13, 1983, Hansen offered 17-year-old Cindy Paulson $200 to perform oral sex; when she got into the car, he pulled out a gun and drove her to his home in Muldoon. There, he held her captive and proceeded to rape and torture her. She later told police that after Hansen chained her by the neck to a post in the house's basement, he took a nap on a nearby couch. When he awoke, he put her in his car and took her to Merrill Field airport, where he told her that he intended to "take her out to his cabin" (a shack in the Knik River area of the Matanuska-Susitna Valley accessible only by boat or bush plane). Paulson, crouched in the back seat of the car with her wrists cuffed in front of her body, saw a chance to escape when Hansen was busy loading the cockpit of his airplane, a Piper PA-18 Super Cub. While Hansen's back was turned, Paulson crawled out of the back seat, opened the driver's side door, and ran toward nearby Sixth Avenue.

Paulson later told police that she had left her blue sneakers on the passenger side floor of the sedan's backseat as evidence that she had been in the car. Hansen panicked and chased her, but Paulson made it to Sixth Avenue first and managed to flag down a passing truck. The driver, Robert Yount, alarmed by Paulson's disheveled appearance, stopped and picked her up. He drove her to the Mush Inn, where she jumped out of the truck and ran inside. While she pleaded with the clerk to phone her boyfriend at the Big Timber Motel, Yount continued on to work, where he called the police to report the barefoot, handcuffed girl.

When Anchorage Police Department (APD) officers arrived at the Mush Inn, they were told that Paulson had taken a cab to the Big Timber Motel. APD officers arrived at Room 110 of the Big Timber Motel and found Paulson, still handcuffed and alone. She was taken to APD headquarters, where she described the perpetrator. Hansen, when questioned by APD officers, denied the accusation, stating that Paulson was just trying to cause trouble for him because he would not pay her extortion demands. Although Hansen had several prior run-ins with the law, his meek demeanour and humble occupation as a baker, along with an alibi from his friend John Henning, kept him from being considered as a serious suspect.

Detective Glenn Flothe of the Alaska State Troopers had been part of a team investigating the discovery of several bodies in and around Anchorage, Seward, and the Matanuska-Susitna Valley area. The first of the bodies was found by construction workers near Eklutna Road. The body, dubbed "Eklutna Annie" by investigators, has never been identified. Later that year, the body of Joanna Messina was discovered in a gravel pit near Seward, and in 1982 the remains of 23-year-old Sherry Morrow were discovered in a shallow grave near the Knik River. Flothe believed all three women had been murdered by the same perpetrator.

Flothe contacted Federal Bureau of Investigation (FBI) Special Agent John Douglas and requested help with an offender profile based on the three recovered bodies. Douglas thought the killer would be an experienced hunter with low self-esteem, have a history of being rejected by women, and would feel compelled to keep "souvenirs" of his murders, such as a victim's jewelry. He also suggested that the assailant might stutter. Using this profile, Flothe investigated possible suspects until he reached Hansen, who fit the profile and owned a plane.

Supported by Paulson's testimony and Douglas's profile, Flothe and the APD secured a warrant to search Hansen's plane, vehicles, and home. On October 27, 1983, investigators uncovered jewelry belonging to some of the missing women as well as an array of firearms in a corner hideaway of Hansen's attic. Also found was an aeronautical chart with 37 little "x" marks on it, hidden behind Hansen's headboard. Many of these marks matched sites where bodies had been found previously (others were discovered later at the locations marked on Hansen's murder map).

When confronted with the evidence found in his home, Hansen denied it as long as he could, but he eventually began to blame the women and tried to justify his actions. Eventually confessing to each item of evidence as it was presented to him, he admitted to a spree of attacks against Alaskan women starting in 1971. Hansen's earliest victims were girls or young women, usually between ages 16 and 19 and not prostitutes, unlike the victims who led to his discovery.

Known victims

Hansen is known to have raped and assaulted over thirty Alaskan women, and to have murdered at least seventeen, ranging in age from 16 to 41. 
Those with an * beside their "Date Found" were found with the help of Hansen after his arrest. 

Of these eighteen women, Hansen was only formally charged with the murders of four: Sherry Morrow, Joanna Messina, "Eklutna Annie", and Paula Goulding. He was also charged with the kidnapping and rape of Cindy Paulson.

Imprisonment 

Once arrested, Hansen was charged with assault, kidnapping, multiple weapons offenses, theft and insurance fraud. The last charge was related to a claim filed with the insurance company over the alleged theft of some trophies; he used the proceeds to purchase his plane. At trial, he claimed he later recovered the trophies in his backyard but forgot to inform the insurer.

Hansen entered into a plea bargain after ballistics tests returned a match between bullets found at the crime scenes and Hansen's rifle. He pleaded guilty to the four homicides the police had evidence for (Morrow, Messina, Goulding, and "Eklutna Annie") and provided details about his other victims in return for serving his sentence in a federal prison, along with no publicity in the press. Another condition of the plea bargain was his participation in deciphering the markings on his aviation map and locating his victims' bodies. Hansen confirmed the police theory of how the women were abducted, adding that he would sometimes let a potential victim go if she convinced him that she would not report him to police. He indicated that he began killing in the early 1970s.

Hansen showed investigators 17 grave sites in and around Southcentral Alaska, 12 of which were unknown to investigators. There remained marks on his map that he refused to give up, including three in Resurrection Bay, near Seward (authorities suspect two of these marks belong to the graves of Mary Thill and Megan Emrick, whom Hansen has denied killing). The remains of 12 (of a probable 21) victims were exhumed by the police and returned to their families.

Hansen was sentenced to 461 years in prison without the possibility of parole. He was first imprisoned at the United States Penitentiary, Lewisburg in Lewisburg, Pennsylvania. In 1988, he was returned to Alaska and briefly incarcerated at Lemon Creek Correctional Center in Juneau. He was also imprisoned at Spring Creek Correctional Center in Seward until May 2014, when he was transported to the Anchorage Correctional Complex for health reasons.

Death
Hansen died on August 21, 2014, aged 75, at Alaska Regional Hospital in Anchorage, due to natural causes from lingering health conditions.

In popular culture

Films

 Naked Fear (2007), about a serial killer who hunts naked abducted women in the remote wilderness of New Mexico, is loosely based on Robert Hansen.

 In The Frozen Ground (2013), John Cusack portrayed Hansen opposite Nicolas Cage as Sergeant Jack Halcombe (a character based on Glenn Flothe) and Vanessa Hudgens as victim-survivor Cindy Paulson.

Television
Bonanza final season 14 episode 'The Hunter' (1972) has a curiously similar story where an escaped war criminal  hunter played by Tom Skerritt hunts down his human prey in the desolate countryside tracking Joe Cartwright who finally turns the tables on him

Documentaries

 The FBI Files episode "Hunter's Game" (1999) depicts Hansen's murderous rampage.
 Crime Stories featured a full 2007 episode of the case.
 The Alaska: Ice Cold Killers episode "Hunting Humans" (January 25, 2012) on Investigation Discovery covered the Hansen case.
 Hidden City season 1, episode 12 ("Anchorage: Robert Hansen's Most Dangerous Game, the Legend of Blackjack Sturges, Eskimo Hu"; airdate February 21, 2012) on the Travel Channel covered the Hansen case.
 Mark of a Killer season 2, episode 6 "Hunted to Death" on Oxygen covered the Hansen case.
 The Butcher Baker: Mind of a Monster aired on September 2, 2020, on Investigation Discovery.
 Very Scary People season 3 episodes 3 and 4, "The Butcher Baker: Terror In The Wilderness part 1" and "The Butcher Baker: The Girls Who Got Away part 2", on Crime and Investigation aired June 5, 2022.

TV series

 "Mind Hunters" and "The Woods", two 2005 episodes of the CBS TV series Cold Case, were inspired by Hansen's crimes.
 In Criminal Minds, season 5, episode 21 ("Exit Wounds"; airdate May 12, 2010), Hansen is referred to by name.
 Hansen's crimes inspired Law & Order: Special Victims Unit, season 13, episode 15 ("Hunting Ground"; airdate February 22, 2012), which depicts a serial killer who hunts women like wild game before killing them.
  Hansen's crimes were also recounted on the May 16, 2020, episode of Oxygen's Mark Of A Killer, "Hunted To Death".
 Kurt Caldwell, known as the Runaway Killer, played by Clancy Brown in Dexter: New Blood was loosely based on Hansen.
 Two 2014 episodes of Silent Witness, series 17, 5 & 6, "In a Lonely Place" depict a serial killer who abducts rapes and then kills women by hunting them in a remote forest area.

Other 
 The case was covered in two parts on September 25, 2021, and October 2, 2021 by the Casefile True Crime Podcast
 The case was covered in two parts on February 6, 2019, and February 13, 2019, by Morbid: A True Crime Podcast

See also 
 List of serial killers by number of victims
 List of serial killers in the United States

References

Further reading

External links 

 
 
 

1939 births
2014 deaths
1960 crimes in the United States
20th-century American criminals
American kidnappers
American male criminals
American murderers of children
American people of Danish descent
American people convicted of arson
American people convicted of murder
American people convicted of theft
American people who died in prison custody
American rapists
American serial killers
Crimes against sex workers in the United States
Criminals from Iowa
History of women in Alaska
Male serial killers
Military personnel from Iowa
People convicted of murder by Alaska
People from Anchorage, Alaska
People from Estherville, Iowa
People from Pocahontas County, Iowa
People with bipolar disorder
People with speech impediment
Prisoners who died in Alaska detention
Serial killers who died in prison custody
United States Army reservists
Violence against women in the United States